Loretta Marion Murray Braxton (January 19, 1934 – February 19, 2019) was an American mathematician who headed the mathematics department at Virginia State University for many years.

Early life and education
Braxton was originally from Winston-Salem, North Carolina. After becoming valedictorian at Atkins High School in Winston-Salem, she studied mathematics at Virginia Union University, a historically black university in Richmond, Virginia, and graduated magna cum laude in 1955.

With this degree, she returned to Atkins High School as a mathematics teacher, and also taught at the junior high school level in Norfolk, Virginia.

Graduate study and academic career
In 1962, she earned a master's degree in mathematics from the University of Illinois Urbana-Champaign, and took a position as instructor of mathematics at Virginia State College, which later became Virginia State University.

While continuing at Virginia State, she earned a doctorate of education, specializing in mathematics education, at the University of Virginia in 1973. Her dissertation was The Effects of Instruction in Sentential Logic on the Growth of the Logical Thinking Abilities of Junior High School Students.

She was promoted through the academic ladder at Virginia State, reading full professor, and became chair of the mathematics department from 1977 until 1992, when she retired as Distinguished Professor Emerita.

Personal life
Braxton was married to a Baptist minister, Rev. Dr. Harold E. Braxton, who became director of religious studies and dean of humanities and social sciences at Virginia State. She died in February 2019.

References

External links

1934 births
2019 deaths
20th-century American mathematicians
American women mathematicians
African-American mathematicians
Virginia Union University alumni
University of Illinois Urbana-Champaign alumni
University of Virginia alumni
Virginia State University faculty
20th-century African-American people
20th-century African-American women
21st-century American women